Juan de Lezica y Torrezuri (1709–1784) was a Spanish nobleman, politician and merchant, who served as alcalde and regidor of Buenos Aires.

Biography 

He was born in Cortézubi, Vizcaya, Spain, the son of Juan de Lezica y Gaçeaga and María de Torrezuri, belonging to a noble family of Basque roots. He was married to Elena de Alquiza y Peñaranda, born in La Paz daughter of Felipe de Alquiza and Juana María de Peñaranda.

Among other duties of public official, Juan de Lezica y Torrezuri was the commander of "La Atrevida", a militia of the Cuerpo de Blandengues de la Frontera de Buenos Aires, in charge of punitive expeditions against infidel Indians. He also served as mayor of 1st vote of Buenos Aires and of La Paz. In 1755, he founded the town of Luján.

References 

1709 births
1784 deaths
Mayors of Buenos Aires
Spanish colonial governors and administrators
18th-century Spanish nobility
18th-century Spanish businesspeople
Río de la Plata